Pancho Búrquez (born 6 June 1958) is a Mexican politician and was member of the National Action Party (PAN) until his resignation in 2018. He is a senator in the LXIII Legislature of the Mexican Congress representing Sonora.

Life

Búrquez was born in Hermosillo and earned his degree in industrial engineering at Tec de Monterrey, as well as a master's degree in high business administration from the IPADE. In the 1980s and 1990s, he directed various businesses. In 1994, he became president of the Northwest Delegation of COPARMEX.

His political career in the PAN began in 1997, and three years later, he was elected Municipal President of Hermosillo. In his three-year term, he was honored with a national anticorruption award from the CIDE. Between 2003 and 2005, he served as president, of the PAN party in the state of Sonora.

He won election to the Senate for the LXII and LXIII Legislatures in 2012. He presides over the Urban Development and Land Use Commission in the Senate and also sits on the Science and Technology, Commerce and Industrial Development, and Energy Commissions.

References

1958 births
Living people
People from Hermosillo
Politicians from Sonora
Members of the Senate of the Republic (Mexico)
National Action Party (Mexico) politicians
21st-century Mexican politicians
Monterrey Institute of Technology and Higher Education alumni
Municipal presidents in Sonora